The first season of Tangle, an Australian drama television series, began airing on 1 October 2009 on Showcase. Season one of Tangle explores the intertwined lives of two families, who sometimes connect and sometimes clash as they journey through life together. It consists of 10 episodes and concluded on 26 November 2009.

Cast

Regular
 Justine Clarke as Ally Kovac
 Kat Stewart as Nat Manning
 Catherine McClements as Christine Williams
 Ben Mendelsohn as Vince Kovac
 Joel Tobeck as Tim Williams
 Matt Day as Gabriel Lucas
Lucia Mastrantone as Em Barker
Blake Davis as Max Williams
 Lincoln Younes as Romeo Kovac
 Eva Lazzaro as Gigi Kovac
 Georgia Flood as Charlotte Barker

Recurring and guest
Tony Rickards as Billy Hall
Reef Ireland as Ned Dougherty
 Madeleine Jay as Kelly
 John Brumpton as Bryan Dougherty
Frank Gallacher as Pat Mahady
 Alicia Banit as Leah
Simon Maiden as Stan, voice of Yuri
 Alison Whyte as Nicky Barnham
 Luke Hemsworth as John
 Kate Jenkinson as Melanie
Lliam Amor as Robert Barker
Maude Davey as Agatha
 Tony Nikolakopoulos as Gordon
Richard Sutherland as Jason

Episodes

Awards and nominations

Wins
 ASTRA Award for Most Outstanding Performance By An Actor: Male – Ben Mendelsohn
 ASTRA Award for Most Outstanding Performance By An Actor: Female – Justine Clarke
 ADG Directors Award for Best Direction in a Television Drama Series – Stuart McDonald (episode 9)

Nominations
 ASTRA Award for Most Outstanding Drama – Tangle
 ASTRA Award for Most Outstanding Performance By An Actor: Male – Matt Day
 ASTRA Award for Most Outstanding Performance By An Actor: Female – Catherine McClements
 ASTRA Award for Best New Talent – Eva Lazzaro
 IF 'Out of the Box' Award – Eva Lazzaro 
 Logie Award for Most Outstanding Drama Series, Miniseries or Telemovie – Tangle
 Logie Award for Most Outstanding Actor – Ben Mendelsohn
 Logie Award for Most Outstanding Actress – Justine Clarke
 Logie Award for Most Outstanding Newcomew Talent – Eva Lazzaro
 NSW Premier's Literary Award for Script Writing – Fiona Seres (episode 1)
 Screen Music Award for Best Music in a Television Series or Serial – Briony Marks (episode 1)

DVD release

References

2009 Australian television seasons